Elizabeth C. Theil is an American biochemist who worked on iron biology. She became the first woman to be appointed to a chaired professorship at North Carolina State University, in 1988; in the same year she received the O. Max Gardner Award of the University of North Carolina.

Theil earned  her B.A. from Cornell University in 1957 and her Ph.D.  from Columbia University in 1962. She joined the NCSU faculty in 1971, where she is currently Professor Emeritus, and in 1998 moved to the Children's Hospital Oakland Research Institute where she is Senior Scientist Emeritus; in 2004 she was also appointed adjunct professor at the University of California, Berkeley, retiring in 2010.

Theil's Research Group discovered that iron directly binds ferritin mRNA to regulate ferritin protein biosynthesis[1], that iron enters ferritin protein though ion channels and pores similar to those in cell membranes, and that ferritin iron, abundant in legumes, can be absorbed intact, with the potential to ameliorate iron deficiency anemia, a disease identified 500 years ago and impacting 30% of the world’s population in 2015.

Publications
Fe2+ binds iron responsive element-RNA, selectively changing protein-binding affinities and regulating mRNA repression and activation. Ma J, Haldar S, Khan MA, Sharma SD, Merrick WC, Theil EC, Goss DJ.Proc Natl Acad Sci U S A. 2012 May 29;109(22):8417-22. doi: 10.1073/pnas.1120045109. Epub 2012 May 14.  
Fe(2+) substrate transport through ferritin protein cage ion channels influences enzyme activity and biomineralization.Behera RK, Torres R, Tosha T, Bradley JM, Goulding CW, Theil EC.J Biol Inorg Chem. 2015 Sep;20(6):957-69. doi: 10.1007/s00775-015-1279-x. Epub 2015 Jul 23.  ;2.Ferritin protein nanocage ion channels: gating by N-terminal extensions.Tosha T, Behera RK, Ng HL, Bhattasali O, Alber T, Theil EC.J Biol Chem. 2012 Apr 13;287(16):13016-25. doi: 10.1074/jbc.M111.332734. Epub 2012 Feb 23.  
Iron homeostasis and nutritional iron deficiency.Theil EC.J Nutr. 2011 Apr 1;141(4):724S-728S. doi: 10.3945/jn.110.127639. Epub 2011 Feb 23. Review..
Ferritin protein nanocages—the story.Theil EC.Nanotechnol Perceptions 2012 Mar 31;8(1):7–16. doi: 10.4024/N03TH12A.ntp.08.01.

References

Year of birth missing (living people)
Living people
American women biochemists
Cornell University alumni
Columbia University alumni
North Carolina State University faculty
University of California, Berkeley faculty
21st-century American women scientists
21st-century American scientists
American women academics